Kylemore Abbey is a Benedictine Monastery founded in 1920 on the grounds of Kylemore Castle, in Connemara, Co. Galway, Ireland. The Abbey was founded for Benedictine nuns who fled Belgium in World War 1. Today, Kylemore Abbey, under The Kylemore Trust, continues its mission as a Benedictine monastery, holding Kylemore and its spiritual mission, natural and built heritage in trust for the Irish nation. Kylemore Abbey also operates as one of Ireland's leading visitor attractions.

History 
Kylemore Castle was built in 1868 as a private home for the family of Mitchell Henry, a wealthy doctor from London whose family was involved in textile manufacturing in Manchester, England. He moved to Ireland when he and his wife Margaret purchased the land around the Abbey, after having travelled there on their honeymoon in the mid-1840s. He became a politician, becoming an MP for County Galway from 1871 to 1885. The castle was designed by James Franklin Fuller, aided by Samuel Ussher Roberts. The construction of the castle began in 1867, and took the total of one hundred men and four years to complete. The facade measures  in width and is made of granite brought from Dalkey by sea to Letterfrack, and of limestone brought from Ballinasloe. There were 33 bedrooms, 4 bathrooms, 4 sitting rooms, a ballroom, billiard room, library, study, school room, smoking room, gun room and various offices and domestic staff residences for the butler, cook, housekeeper and other servants. Other buildings include a Gothic church and family mausoleum containing the bodies of Margaret Henry, Mitchell Henry and a great-grandnephew.

The Abbey remained in Henry's estate after he returned to England. The castle was sold to the Duke and Duchess of Manchester in 1903, who resided there for several years before being forced to sell the house and grounds because of gambling debts. In 1920, the Irish Benedictine Nuns purchased the Abbey castle and lands after they were forced to flee Ypres during World War I. The nuns, who had been based in Ypres for several hundred years, had been bombed out of their Abbey during World War I. They were rescued by men of the 8th Battalion of the Royal Munster Fusiliers, a scene that was later reproduced in the Freeman's Journal. After they left Ypres they were evacuated to England where they remained until 1920. The nuns continued to offer education to Catholic girls, opening an international boarding school and establishing a day school for girls from the locality. The school was the main educational establishment for most girls from Renvyle, Letterfrack and further afield for almost a century but it was forced to close in 2010. The nuns have since been developing new education and retreat activities.

At the General Chapter, that was held in July 2022 at the Buckfast Abbey, the Kylemore Abbey was accepted to the English Benedictine Congregation along with two other new communities of nuns: Mariavall Abbey from Sweden and Jamberoo Abbey from Australia.

University of Notre Dame - Kylemore Abbey Global Centre  
Since 2015, the Abbey has a partnership with the University of Notre Dame of the US. The abbey hosts academic programmes for Notre Dame students, and the university renovated spaces in the abbey. The programmes started in 2016 with about 100 students moving to Kylemore, a dedication ceremony was attended by Fr. Timothy Scully, Justice Peter Kelly(President of the High Court of Ireland) and Mother Abbess Máire Hickey OSB of Kylemore, as well as the US and Canadian ambassadors. Notre Dame's Mendoza College of Business, some of its executive business programme, such as the Inspirational Leadership course at kylemore. The art en plein air class and flute master class by Sir James Galway were also hosted in Kylemore.

The Kylemore Abbey Biodiversity Stewardship Programme commenced in 2021 in partnership with the School of Natural Sciences, NUI Galway, to document and allow students to research the biodiversity of the Kylemore estate.

Gardens 
The Estate includes large walled Victorian Gardens. Since the 1970s these have been open for public tours and nature walks. The Benedictine community has restored the Abbey's gardens and church with donations and local artisans in order to be a self-sustaining estate. The gardens include a Kitchen Garden and a flower garden, the original walled garden was laid out by head gardener, James Garnier in 1870. A complete restoration commenced in 1995.

In the Media 

Kylemore Abbey was featured in the UK cooking show Two Fat Ladies, Series 3 Episode 1 "Benedictine Nuns" (1998). The host cooks Jennifer Paterson & Clarissa Dickson-Wright, cooked dinner for the Benedictine nuns that live, work and worship at the abbey. Kylemore Abbey and the nuns featured on RTE's Nationwide TV programme in 2020, to celebrate 100 years of the Benedictine order at the abbey. Kylemore also featured in Heaven Made, which follows nuns and monks making traditional gifts for Christmas.

See also
 List of abbeys and priories in Ireland (County Galway)

References

External links

 Kylemore Abbey & Victorian Walled Gardens, Connemara, County Galway, Ireland.
 Kylemore Abbey, Connemara, Co. Galway.
 Notre Dame University - The Kylemore Abbey Global Centre

Roman Catholic churches completed in 1868
19th-century Christian monasteries
Christian organizations established in 1920
Christian monasteries in the Republic of Ireland
Secondary schools in County Galway
Buildings and structures in County Galway
Houses in the Republic of Ireland
Religion in County Galway
Benedictine nunneries in the Republic of Ireland
Gardens in County Galway
Tourist attractions in County Galway
19th-century Roman Catholic church buildings in Ireland
Monasteries of the English Benedictine Congregation
19th-century churches in the Republic of Ireland